Przyłęk  is a village in Zwoleń County, Masovian Voivodeship, in east-central Poland. It is the seat of the gmina (administrative district) called Gmina Przyłęk.

References

Villages in Zwoleń County